Shari may refer to:

 In South Asia, women's clothing also known as sari or saree
 In Buddhism, bead-shaped objects among the cremated ashes of Buddhist spiritual masters, also known as Śarīra

Japanese culture 
 Shari, deadwood on the main trunk of a bonsai tree
 Flavored rice used in making sushi

Places 
 Mount Shari, a quaternary stratovolcano
 Shari, Hokkaido, Japan
 Shari District, Hokkaido, Japan
 Shari River, a 949-kilometer-long river of central Africa
 Shari Mari, Anaqcheh Rural District, Ahvaz County, Khuzestan Province, Iran

People

Given name
 Shari (actress), Indian film actress in Malayalam and Tamil films
 Shari Addison (born 1962), American gospel musician and artist
 Shari Arison (born 1957), American-born Israeli businesswoman and philanthropist
 Shari Belafonte (born 1954), American actress, model, writer and singer
 Shari Cantor (born 1959), American politician
 Shari Decter Hirst, Canadian politician
 Shari Elliker, American radio personality
 Shari Eubank (born 1947), American actress
 Shari Flanzer, 1992 World Series of Poker champion
 Shari Goldhagen, American author
 Shari Headley (born 1964), American film actress
 Shari Karney (born 1954), American attorney, incest-survivor activist, and bar exam review company owner
 Shari Koch (born 1993), German competitive ice dancer
 Shari Leibbrandt-Demmon (born 1966), Dutch curler
 Shari Lewis (1933–1998), Jewish American ventriloquist, puppeteer, and children's television show host
 Shari Mendelson (born 1961), American sculptor.
 Shari Olefson, American real estate attorney and author
 Shari Redstone (born 1954), American media executive
 Shari Rhodes (1938–2009), American casting director and producer
 Shari Robertson, American film Ddrector and producer
 Shari Roman, American film director, writer and artist
 Shari Sebbens (born 1985), Australian actress
 Shari Shattuck (born 1960), American actress and author
 Shari Sheeley (1940–2002), American songwriter
 Shari (singer) (born 2002), Italian singer
 Shari Springer Berman (born 1963), American filmmaker
 Shari Thurer, American psychologist
 Shari Ulrich (born 1951), Canadian singer-songwriter
 Shari Villarosa (born 1951), United States diplomat and career foreign service officer

Surname
 Amirudin Shari (born 1980), Malaysian politician
 Said Ali Shari (1971–2013), Saudi Arabian deputy leader of the terrorist group Al-Qaeda

Other uses
 Shari (album), a 1989 European release by Shari Belafonte
 Shari massacre, on 23–24 December 1997 near Tiaret, Algeria
 Shari Rothenberg, a character in the television series 24
 Shari Sawwing or black saw-wing (Psalidoprocne pristoptera), a bird in the swallow family
 Temple Shari Emeth, Manalapan, New Jersey, United States
 Ubangi-Shari, a French territory in central Africa which became the independent country of the Central African Republic in 1960

See also
 Chari (disambiguation)
 Chéri (disambiguation)
 Cheri (disambiguation)
 Cherie (disambiguation)
 Cherri (disambiguation)
 Cherrie, a surname or given name
 Cherry (disambiguation)
 Sheri (disambiguation)
 Sherie, a given name
 Sherri (name)
 Sherrie, a given name
 Sherry (disambiguation)
 Shery (born 1985), Guatemalan Latin pop singer and songwriter